Søren Johansen (born 6 November 1939) is a Danish statistician and econometrician who is known for his contributions to the theory of cointegration. He is currently a professor at the Department of Economics, University of Copenhagen and in the Center for Research in Econometric Analysis of Time Series (CREATES) of the Aarhus University. He has previously held positions at the Department of Statistics, University of Copenhagen, and the European University Institute in Florence.

Biography

Early life
Johansen was born in 1939 in Denmark.

Academic life
Johansen graduated from the University of Copenhagen in mathematical statistics. He began his academic career at the University of Copenhagen,  Institute of Mathematical Statistics in 1964 and was promoted to full professor in 1989. In 1967 he obtained the Gold medal from University of Copenhagen for the thesis "An application of extreme points methods in probability" and in 1974, he became dr. phil. with the thesis "The embedding problem for Markov chains".

Johansen visited UCSD where he interacted with Robert Engle and Clive Granger during the years that the theory on cointegration was taking shape. In the period 1996-2001 he held a Chair in Econometrics at the European University Institute.

According to some rankings he was the most cited researcher in the world in economic journals.

Johansen is married to Katarina Juselius, who is also a professor at the University of Copenhagen and was ranked as the eighth most cited economist in the world from 1990–2000 (Johansen was first among this list). Juselius is the author of "The Cointegrated VAR Model: Methodology and Application" (2006) from Oxford University Press.

Honours and awards
1967 Gold medal from University of Copenhagen for the thesis "An application of extreme points methods in probability"
1997 Dir. Ib Henriksens Fund Award, for outstanding research.

Publications

References

External links
 Home page at University of Copenhagen

Academic staff of the University of Copenhagen
Academic staff of the European University Institute
University of Copenhagen alumni
Econometricians
Fellows of the Econometric Society
Time series econometricians
Danish statisticians
1939 births
Living people